Jordi Meeus (born 1 July 1998 in Lommel) is a Belgian cyclist, who currently rides for UCI WorldTeam .

Career achievements

Major results

2016
 2nd Omloop der Vlaamse Gewesten
 4th Guido Reybrouck Classic
 6th Ronde van Vlaanderen Juniores
 9th Kuurne–Brussels–Kuurne Juniors
2018
 1st Gooikse Pijl
 6th Ronde van Midden-Nederland
 7th Dorpenomloop Rucphen
 10th Overall Olympia's Tour
2019
 3rd Gylne Gutuer
 4th Road race, National Under-23 Road Championships
 6th Memorial Van Coningsloo
 10th Slag om Norg
2020
 1st  Road race, National Under-23 Road Championships
 Czech Cycling Tour
1st  Points classification
1st Stages 2 & 3
 1st Stage 6 Giro Ciclistico d'Italia
 2nd Paris–Tours Espoirs
 4th Gooikse Pijl
 4th Ster van Zwolle
 5th Antwerp Port Epic
 7th Road race, UEC European Under-23 Road Championships
 10th Dorpenomloop Rucphen
2021
 1st Paris–Bourges
 1st Stage 2 Tour de Hongrie
 2nd Eurométropole Tour
 2nd Grand Prix de Denain
 3rd Gooikse Pijl
 4th Road race, National Road Championships
 4th Nokere Koerse
2022
 1st Primus Classic
 1st Stage 5 Tour of Britain
 2nd Road race, National Road Championships
 5th Paris–Bourges
 6th Omloop van het Houtland
 8th Gooikse Pijl
2023
 2nd Down Under Classic
 3rd Clásica de Almería
 3rd Vuelta a Murcia
 7th Milano–Torino
 8th Kuurne–Brussels–Kuurne

Grand Tour general classification results timeline

References

External links

1998 births
Living people
Belgian male cyclists
People from Lommel
Cyclists from Limburg (Belgium)
21st-century Belgian people